Aaptos aaptos is a species of sea sponge belonging to the family Suberitidae.

This particular species is known to contain adrenoreceptor-blocking compounds. While it is highly toxic to fish, it is known to be preyed upon by the hawksbill turtle, Eretmochelys imbricata.

References

Aaptos
Sponges described in 1864